The 17th Maine was organized at Camp King, Cape Elizabeth, and mustered on August 18, 1862. Left State for Washington, D. C., August 21. Attached to Defences of Washington to October, 1862. 3rd Brigade, 1st Division, 3rd Army Corps, Army Potomac, to March, 1864. 2nd Brigade, 3rd Division, 2nd Army Corps, to June, 1864. 1st Brigade, 3rd Division, 2nd Corps, to March, 1865. 2nd Brigade, 3rd Division, 2nd Corps, to June, 1865.

Service
Organized at Camp King, Cape Elizabeth, Maine, it was mustered in for three years' service on August 18, 1862, and was mustered out on June 10, 1865. Recruits still liable to serve were transferred to 1st Maine Volunteer Heavy Artillery Regiment. The regiment was one of five raised in answer to the July 2, 1862, call by Lincoln for 300,000 volunteers for three years. The state of Maine's quota was 9,609.

The regiment was recruited in southern Maine from Androscoggin, Cumberland, Franklin, and York counties. As recruits entered training camp, the regiment quickly fleshed out to ten companies, A through K. Upon muster into federal service, each recruit received a federal bounty of $27.00.

Detailed Service

1862
 Left State for Washington, D.C., August 21. — Commanded by Colonel Thomas Roberts
 Attached to Defenses of Washington to October 7, 1862.
 At Upton's Hill, Va., until October 12 — Attached to Berry's 3rd Brigade, Birney's 1st Division, Hooker's III Corps, Burnside's Army of Potomac
 Edwards Ferry October 12–28.
 Advance to Warrenton, thence to Falmouth, Va., October 28 – November 22.
 Battle of Fredericksburg December 12–15.
 Eastern Bank of Rappahannock December 12–13
 Fields southwest of Fredericksburg December 13–15 — 2 men killed and 19 wounded, complimented by Gen. Berry for steadiness of the men under fire for the first time.
 To winter encampment, Falmouth, Va., December 16

1863
 Falmouth, VA
 "Mud March" January 20–24
 Back to encampment, Camp Sickles, Falmouth, January 25 — Hooker takes command of Army of the Potomac, January 26
 Chancellorsville Campaign April 27 – May 6. — Attached to Hayman's 3rd Brigade, Birney's 1st Division, Sickle's III Corps, Hooker's Army of Potomac
 The Plank Road, April 29–30
 To Brandy Station September 15
 Bristoe Campaign October 9–22. — Commanded by Colonel George Warren West. Attached to de Trobriand's 3rd Brigade, Birney's 1st Division, French's III Corps, Meade's Army of Potomac
 First Battle of Auburn, October 13
 Second Battle of Auburn, October 14
 Battle of Bristoe Station, October 14
 Advance to line of the Rappahannock November 7–8
 Kelly's Ford November 7
 Mine Run Campaign November 26 – December 2
 Battle of Payne's Farm November 27. Lost 52 men killed, wounded, and missing 
 Battle of Mine Run November 28–30. — Division reserve and then flank skirmishers.

1864
 Demonstration on the Rapidan February 6–7.
 Overland Campaign May 3 – June 15. — Broke camp under command Colonel West, 21 commissioned officers, 5 acting officers, and 439 enlisted men.
 Battle of the Wilderness May 5–7. — Commanded by West/Walker/Moore. Attached to Hays'/Crocker's 2nd Brigade, Birney's 3rd Division, Hancock's II Corps, Meade's Army of Potomac. Set up entrenchments May 5 along Brock Road. May 6, drove enemy from Brock one mile, and retreated unmolested to Brock Road works. Repulsed several unsuccessful assaults by Longstreet's Corps. Heavy fighting along fortifications set brush on fire. Lost 24 men killed, 147 wounded and 12 missing.
 Laurel Hill May 8.
 Spotsylvania May 8–9
 Skirmishing on Po River May 10. — Lost 10 wounded 2 missing.
 Battle of Spotsylvania Court House May 11–21, — Attached to Crocker's/Egan's 2nd Brigade, Birney's 3rd Division, Hancock's II Corps, Meade's Army of Potomac.
 Skirmishing between Po and Brock Road, May 11 — While erecting works, lost 2 wounded
 "Bloody Angle," Assault on the Salient, May 12. — With Corps, stealthily pulled at night from Union right wing to pass behind and to woods at left end of the line. At daybreak from these woods assaulted, captured, and held breast works. Sergeant Frank Haskell and Private John F Totman captured defending Confederate division commander, Edward Johnson (general). Lost 3 killed, 41 wounded, and 10 missing.
 Lieutenant Colonel Merrill returned from Maine, relieved Major Moore, and took command
 Harris Farm, Fredericksburg Road, May 19.
 Battle of North Anna May 23–26. — Attacked, took, and held rebel positions to south and west overlooking North Anna river. Lost 4 killed and 17 wounded.
 Line of the Pamunkey May 26–28.
 Totopotomoy May 28–31.
 Battle of Cold Harbor June 1–12. — Attached to Egan's 1st Brigade, Birney's 3rd Division, Hancock's II Corps, Meade's Army of Potomac. Birney's Division anchored right wing of army. Lost 23 men.On June 4, gained 129 men transferred from 3rd Maine whose enlistment still remained. In works skirmishing until 21:00, May 12 when repeating Spotsylvania move, shifted behind center and left of Army of Potomac, quietly took positions in the moonlight at new left wing.
 Wilcox Landing, June 14
 Before Petersburg June 16–19.
 Siege of Petersburg June 16, 1864, to April 2, 1865. — Lost 84 men
 Second Battle of Petersburg June 15–18 — Commanded by Captain John C. Perry/Captain Benjamin C. Pennell/Major Erasmus C. Gilbreath (of the 20th IN). Attached to Egan's/Madill's 1st Brigade, Birney's/Mott's 3rd Division, Birney's/Hancock's II Corps, Meade's Army of Potomac. Made two unsuccessful assaults on Confederate entrenchments on June 16. On June 17 occupied the same works which had been captured the night before. On June 18, advanced and took defenses from enemy again. Lost 10 Killed, 46 wounded, and 9 missing.
 Battle of Jerusalem Plank Road June 22–23. — Commanded by Gilbreath. Attached to de Trobriand's 1st Brigade, Mott's 3rd Division, Hancock's II Corps, Meade's Army of Potomac. Occupied second line during June 22 and watched Mahone's attack stall at first line as well as 2nd brigade's unsuccessful attack to recapture first line. Attacked and retook front line morning June 23, which had been abandoned early morning by rebels.
 Fatigue duty dismantling rebel fortifications, extending Union entrenchments, July 4–26
 First Battle of Deep Bottom, north of the James, July 27–28. — Commanded by Gilbreath. Attached to de Trobriand's 1st Brigade, Mott's 3rd Division, Hancock's II Corps, Meade's Army of Potomac. Held in reserve for Mott's 3rd Division. Deployed as skirmishers to protect right flank to Bailey's Run.
 Battle of the Crater July 30. — 'Commanded by Gilbreath. Attached to de Trobriand's 1st Brigade, Mott's 3rd Division, Hancock's II Corps, Meade's Army of Potomac. Held in trenches byu brigade commander when intel reported opposite works fully manned. Lieutenant Colonel Merrill takes command July 31.
 Second Battle of Deep Bottom August 13–20. — Commanded by Merrill. Attached to de Trobriand's 1st Brigade, Mott's 3rd Division, Hancock's II Corps, Meade's Army of Potomac. Embarked on steamers to make show of sailing away, but returned under nightfall to Deep Bottom.
 Strawberry Plains August 14–18. — Enemy taken by surprise and driven from positions. Captured coastal defense batteries. Kept up constant harassing fore from skirmishers to pin down rebel forces.
 Second Battle of Ream's Station August 25. — Brigade under arms as Corps reserve
 In entrenchments to the right of Fort Sedgewick, August 29 – September 28
 Poplar Springs Church September 29 – October 2.
 Colonel West returns and takes command October 12.
 Battle of Boydton Plank Road October 27–28. — Commanded by West/Captain William Hobson. Attached to de Trobriand's 1st Brigade, Mott's 3rd Division, Hancock's II Corps, Meade's Army of Potomac. Repulsed breakthrough on Egan's division October 27. Colonel West wounded again. Entrenched and held off Hampton's division on October 28. 
 Garrison at Fort Rice October 30 – November 29
 To left flank at James River, November 30 – December 6
 Raid on Weldon Railroad December 7–11. — Commanded by Hobson. Attached to de Trobriand's 1st Brigade, Mott's 3rd Division, Warren's V Corps, Meade's Army of Potomac (Raiding force consisted of V Corps plus Mott's Division, 3rd Division II Corps and Division of Cavalry). Marched 40 miles south to Jarratt to cut rail link between Petersburg and Wilmington From Nottaway River to Bellfield. On return to siege lines found stragglers and sick members of raiding party who had fallen behind murdered by local civilians along route. Burned houses in retaliation.
 Winter encampment in the lines before Petersburg until February 4, 1865

1865
 William Hobson promoted to Lieutenant Colonel January 18. Retained command 17th Maine.
 Battle of Hatcher's Run February 5–7 — Commanded by Lieutenant Colonel William Hobson<. Attached to Pierce's 2nd Brigade, Mott's/de Trobriand's 3rd Division, Humphreys' II Corps, Meade's Army of Potomac. Advanced and captured enemy entrenchments at Hatcher's run on left wing of Union lines and turned enemy flank February 5. Captured 100 prisoners. Pulled reserve February 6. Sent to left flank again February 7.
 In entrenchments until March 25
 Appomattox Campaign March 28 – April 9.
 South Side Railroad March 29.
 Boydton Road and White Oak Ridge March 30–31.
 Fall of Petersburg April 2.
 Jettersville April 5. — Captured colors of 21st North Carolina and 150 prisoners.
 Dentonville April 6. — Division charged over two miles and captured part of rebel wagon train. Hobson wounded. Captain Green took command. Over 300 prisoners taken. Lost 5 killed, 27 wounded. Noted that one in five officers were wounded and one in ten enlisted wounded during the day.
 High Bridge April 6–7. — Major Charles P Mattocks takes command evening April 6
 New Store April 8.
 Appomattox Court House April 9. — Surrender of Lee and his army.
 At Burkesville April 11 – May 1.
 March to Washington, D. C., May 1–15.
 Grand Review May 23.
 Mustered out at Bailey's Cross Roads June 4, 1865.
 Recruits transferred to 1st Maine Heavy Artillery.
 Discharged at Portland, Me., June 10, 1865.

Armament

The 17th Maine was an 1862, Army of the Potomac, three-year regiment, that greatly increased the number of men under arms in the federal army. As with many of these volunteers, initially, there were not enough Model 1861 Springfield Rifles to go around so they were instead issued imported British Pattern 1853 rifles. These were the standard rifle for the British army having performed well in the Crimean War. The Enfield was a .577 calibre Minié-type muzzle-loading rifled musket. It was used by both armies and was the second most widely used infantry weapon in the Union forces.

At Gettysburg, on the evening of July 3, General Birney wanted to standardize the weapons in his division. That evening, he had the 17th and other Enfield-equipped units in his command exchange their arms for the standard muzzle-loading rifled musket of the Union Army, the Springfield Model 1861 Rifled Musket. It fired a .58 inch Minie Ball. and came with a square socket bayonet. They would carry their Springfields until their end of service.

Casualties and total strength
The 17th Maine enrolled 1,371 men during its existence. It lost 12 officers and 116 enlisted men killed in action or died of wounds received in battle and an additional 4 officers and 159 enlisted men died of disease. 31 men died in Confederate prisons. Total fatalities for the regiment were 370.

See also

 List of Maine Civil War units
 Maine in the American Civil War

Footnotes

Citations

References

 
 
 
 
 
 
 
 
 .
 
 
 
 
 
 
 
 
 
 
 
 
 
 
 
 
 
 
 
 
 
 
 Civilwarhome – Gettysburg Union order of battle
 Civil War Trust – Gettysburg Union order of battle
 Eicher, John H. "Gettysburg Order of Battle" at Gettysburg Discussion Group website.
 Gettysburg Discussion Group - Union order of battle
 Gettysburg National Military Park - The Army of the Potomac at Gettysburg

External links
 State of Maine Civil War Records Website
 Photograph of the 17th Maine Infantry from the Maine Memory Network

17th Maine Volunteer Infantry Regiment
1862 establishments in Maine
Military units and formations established in 1862
Military units and formations disestablished in 1865